Ward of the State is a three-issue comic book limited series published by Shadowline comics, a division of Image Comics.

Plot
Dravis, Carrie, Clifton, Harkin, and Devon have been left in the Foster care of Ms. Balitzer, a foster mother with a secret. She has been training the children to be assassins. When one of their own dies, they must find who the killer is before they are all dead.

References
 Ward of the State @ comicbookdb

Image Comics limited series
Shadowline titles